The Limbach L275E is a German aircraft engine, designed and produced by Limbach Flugmotoren of Königswinter for use in UAVs.

Design and development
The L275E is a twin cylinder horizontally-opposed two-stroke, air-cooled, direct-drive gasoline engine design, based upon the Volkswagen air-cooled engine. It employs a single magneto ignition, two carburettors, is lubricated by oil mixture lubrication with a fuel to oil ratio of 25:1 for mineral oil or 50:1 for synthetic oil and produces  at 7200 rpm.

Applications
CAC Fox

Specifications (L275E)

See also

References

External links

Limbach aircraft engines
Two-stroke aircraft piston engines
Air-cooled aircraft piston engines